Thérèse Schwartze (20 December 185123 December 1918) was a Dutch portrait painter.

Life

Thérèse Schwartze was born on 20 December 1851 in Amsterdam in the Netherlands. She was the daughter of the painter Johan Georg Schwartze, who grew up in Philadelphia and trained in Düsseldorf.

Schwartze received her first training from her father, before studying for a year at the Rijksacademie van Beeldende Kunsten. She then travelled to Munich and studied under Gabriel Max and Franz von Lenbach. In 1879 she went to Paris to continue her studies under Jean-Jacques Henner. When she returned to Amsterdam she became a member of Arti et Amicitiae.  Schwartze exhibited her work at the Palace of Fine Arts at the 1893 World's Columbian Exposition in Chicago, Illinois.

Death

On 22 July 1918 her husband, Anton van Duyl, died. As Schwartze was in bad health at that time (and tried to hide this), the death of her husband was a blow that she could not overcome easily. She died in Amsterdam on 23 December 1918 from a sudden illness.

Schwartze was buried at Zorgvlied cemetery in Amsterdam. Later she was reburied at the Nieuwe Ooster cemetery in Amsterdam, where her sister created a memorial to her, modelled after her death mask, which is now considered a rijksmonument.

Works

Her portraits, mostly of Amsterdam's elite, are remarkable for excellent character drawing, breadth and vigour of handling and rich quality of pigment. She signed her works "Th. Schwartze" and was married late in life in 1906 to Anton van Duyl, whereupon she signed works with "Th. v Duyl.Schwartze".

She was one of the few women painters who had been honoured by an invitation to contribute their portraits to the hall of painters at the Uffizi Gallery in Florence. Some of her best pictures, notably a portrait of Piet J Joubert, and Three Inmates of the Orphanage at Amsterdam, are at the Rijksmuseum, and one entitled Five Amsterdam Orphans at the Boijmans Van Beuningen Museum in Rotterdam.

Her niece Lizzy Ansingh, who she painted a few times, also became a painter. Her sister Georgine Schwartze became a sculptor. She lived with her extended family at Prinsengracht 1901 in Amsterdam and painted her housemates in 1915:

Works of Thérèse Schwartze by museum
Jewish antique dealer, Joods Historisch Museum
Portrait of Mozes de Vries van Buren, Joods Historisch Museum
Portrait of Abraham Carel Wertheim, Joods Historisch Museum
Portrait of P. M. Wertheim-Wertheim, Joods Historisch Museum
Portrait of Dr. J.L. Dusseau (1870), Rijksmuseum
Young Italian woman with the dog Puck (1879), Rijksmuseum
Portrait of Peter Marius Tutein Nolthenius (1879/1880), Rijksmuseum
Portrait of Frederik Daniël Otto Obreen (1883), Rijksmuseum
Three Inmates of the Orphanage at Amsterdam (1885), Rijksmuseum
Portrait of Dr. P.J.H. Cuypers (1885), Rijksmuseum
Portrait of Alida Elisabeth Grevers (1889), Rijksmuseum
Portrait of Piet Joubert (1890), Rijksmuseum
Portrait of Paul Joseph Constantin Gabriël (1899), Rijksmuseum
Portrait of Amelia Eliza van Leeuwen (1900), Rijksmuseum
Portrait of Lizzie Ansingh (1902), Rijksmuseum
Portrait of Maria Catharina Josephine Jordan (1902), Rijksmuseum
Portrait of C.M van der Goot-Mabé Grevingh (1883), Teylers Museum
Several drawings, Leiden University
Portrait of Prof Adriaan Heynsius (1883), Leiden University
Portrait of Prof Gustaaf Schlegel (c. 1900), Leiden University
Portrait of Prof A.P.N. Franchimont (1899), Leiden University
Portrait of Prof. M.J. de Goeje (c. 1905), Leiden University
Portrait of Prof Blok (1914), Leiden University

Gallery

References

Attribution:

Art work listings are translated from the Dutch Wikipedia.

Sources
 Hollema, Cora and Kouwenhoven, Pieternel, Thérèse Schwartze, Painting for a Living, 2nd edn Amsterdam 2021, www.thereseschwartze.com

External links

 http://www.thereseschwartze.com
 

 
1851 births
1918 deaths
Dutch portrait painters
Painters from Amsterdam
Dutch women painters
19th-century Dutch painters
19th-century Dutch women artists
20th-century Dutch painters
20th-century Dutch women artists